Several members of the order Pucciniales are commonly called leaf rusts:
 Wheat leaf rust caused by Puccinia triticina
 Hemileia vastatrix which causes Coffee leaf rust
 Leaf rust (barley) or barley leaf rust or brown rust or barley brown rust...
 ... or its causative agent Puccinia hordei
 Phakopsora euvitis commonly known as Asian grapevine leaf rust